Víctor Orlando Bisonó Haza (born August 27, 1963) nicknamed Ito Bisonó, is a Dominican politician, Businessman and current member of the Chamber of Deputies of the Dominican Republic representing the 2nd circunscription of the National District since the year 2002. Bisonó was a member of the Social Christian Reformist Party, and he has been Second Vice President of the Dominican-Haitian Chamber of Commerce.

Early life and education 
Ito Bisonó was born in Santo Domingo, and is the son of architect Victor Bisonó Pichardo, born into a prominent family from Villa Bisonó in Santiago, and Ivonne Haza, a renowned national soprano from San Pedro de Macorís. He completed grade school at Colegio Santa Teresita and his undergraduate studies at the Universidad Iberoamericana (UNIBE), achieving his degree in Business Management. He also completed some courses in Engineering at the Universidad Nacional Pedro Henríquez Ureña.

Bisonó is descended from Domingo Daniel Pichardo, Vice President of the Dominican Republic from 1857 to 1858, and Fernando Valerio, who is considered a hero of the Battle of Santiago (1844).

Entering politics 
Bisonó joined the Social Christian Reformist Party in the early 1980s when it was in the opposition after having been in government for 12 years with its leader Joaquín Balaguer. The Dominican Revolutionary Party seemed unstoppable at the time after beating the PRSC by wide margins in 1978 and 1982 with Antonio Guzmán and Salvador Jorge Blanco respectively. Ito did not come from a political family and what connections his family did have were actually with the PRD rather than the reformists as his mother was a singing coach for President Guzman and during the government of Salvador Jorge Blanco both mother and father were part of the administration as Director of the National Theatre and the Patronage of Bellas Artes respectively. However he developed a conservative or classical liberal ideology that did not fit in with the PRD, a member of Socialist International.

He along with many other young members of the PRSC were very active and influential in Balaguer's victory at the 1986 Dominican Republic general election. This new government was essentially different from the previous 12 years since the Cold War was nearing its end and political confrontation between the Dominican left and right was now strictly political as opposed to armed conflict. Many new faces joined Balaguer, and Ito became one of them.

Government work 
Bisonó had many different positions during Balaguer's 10 years of government which included being assistant to the Secretary of Public Works, assistant of the administrator of the Dominican Corporation of Electricity (where he became well known to the public), assistant of the Dominican Council for Promotion of Foreign Investment and spokesperson of at the Administrative Board of the Dominican Marble Industry.

Congress
In 1998 he won internal primaries to become candidate for deputy representing his party but the PRSC was in deep crisis and only gained 2 seats in Santo Domingo and 17 nationwide that year. This was during a time when the election to the Chamber of Deputies was done using Closed party lists. Although he had won the primaries with 16,000 votes, he was placed at number 10 which effectively crippled his chances. He however kept campaigning not so much for himself but for the party and then again in the presidential election of 2000, when Balaguer entered the race one last time and had an excellent showing considering his late entry to the race and divided party. The party was 2nd place overall and 3rd place taking into account the political alliance between the Dominican Liberation Party and the Bloque Institucional Social Démocrata. For the 2002 elections with the party more united than in 1998 and with the recently created preferential vote which allowed the electorate to cast their vote for any candidate from the party list, Bisonó joined the Chamber of Deputies of the Dominican Republic after having received 4,667 votes in a universe of 60,000.

Bisonó became one of the more well known faces of his party in that period which lead to him being elected party spokesperson for 2002–2003 during which time he led various opposition measures against the majority PRD and even received the support of the PLD at times. This made him viable candidate for President of the Lower Chamber for which he received the support of over a dozen fellow congressmen. A very impressionable feat for a freshman.

During this first term in office he was voted in unanimously as member of the National Council of the Magistrate which is the board that appoints the judges of the Dominican Supreme Court of Justice. 25 deputies from all 3 main parties gave him their support.

In congress he is a member of the following committees: Finance, Human Rights, Public Works, Energy, Mining and Dominicans abroad.

He was re-elected for a second term in congress after the 2006 election and was the only winning candidate of the PRSC in the Dominican capital and then again in 2010 this time as the candidate with the most votes.

Environmental work 
Because of his role in defending the environment of the Dominican Republic, Bisonó has become the representative of eco-friendly Dominicans in Congress. He has sponsored many events to decrease pollution, fumigate areas affected by infested lagoons, tree planting sprees as well as presenting many comprehensive pieces of legislation concerning environmental conservation and climate change.

Role in the PRSC 
Although Ito was very active in his support of Eduardo Estrella inside the PRSC, when the latter left the party the former decided to stay. Not being a member of any of the warring factions within his party has allowed him to become one of its more popular members.

Since party leader Joaquín Balaguer's death in 2002, the party has seen many divisions. The most controversial was the one caused by the 2003 primaries which resulted in Eduardo Estrella winning over former Vice-President Jacinto Peynado. There were accusations that Estrella was sponsored by Hipólito Mejía and this caused many members to ally with the Dominican Liberation Party and its candidate Leonel Fernández.

These division caused strong defeats for the party and especially so in the 2008 election in which the party did not pass the 5% threshold in orden to stay a majority party. This led Congressman Bisonó to call for party renewal and he aspired to become President of the PRSC for which great support was received nationwide. However, after the return of those who had allied themselves with Fernandez, the presidency was handed to Carlos Morales Troncoso as a result of Amable Aristy Castro jumping out of the race and throwing his support to behind the Foreign Minister. Ito was finally named to the collegiate Permanent Presidential Commission of the party as one of the 13 members than compose it.

Initially supporting Carlos Morales, he began to drift apart after it became clear that the new party leader was very committed to the governing PLD and party members who did not want a first round alliance with Danilo Medina asked him to run for the Presidency in representation of the PRSC as a way to assure an independent position. Even before all this, he had appeared as a very strong third candidate in a Gallup poll with a respectable 9 percent behind Morales with 14. After announcing and beginning his campaign in late March, he quickly surpassed him and polled 19% in Gallup while Morales still had 14 and then 20% in Penn Schoen Berland effectively displacing the former second place holder who now polled 8%. Amable Aristy was first place in all of these but he has not indicated intention of running.

Personal life 
He is married to Isabel M. León Nouel (the daughter of Guillermo León Asensio and Mercedes Nouel Victoria; Isabel is niece of José León Asensio, granddaughter of Eduardo León Jimenes and Carlos Tomás Nouel y Bobadilla, and therefore grandniece of Adolfo Alejandro Nouel y Bobadilla) with whom he has 3 children: Andrés Guillermo, Daniela Isabel and Diego Orlando Bisonó León.

Ancestors

Notes

References

External links 
 Personal site

Members of the Chamber of Deputies of the Dominican Republic
Social Christian Reformist Party politicians
Living people
1963 births
Dominican Republic people of Basque descent
Dominican Republic people of Canarian descent
Dominican Republic people of Cuban descent
Dominican Republic people of French descent
Dominican Republic people of Spanish descent
White Dominicans